Moyadam is a townland of 685 acres in County Antrim, Northern Ireland. It is situated in the civil parish of Grange of Nilteen and the historic barony of Antrim Upper.

History
In the Papal Taxation c.1306 the name of the townland is recorded as Maudone, the name of a church site. Its name is variously recorded as Ballimoyden in 1605 and Ballymoyeden in 1621.

Archaeology
The townland contains a standing stone at grid ref: J2510 8831.

See also 
List of townlands in County Antrim
List of archaeological sites in County Antrim

References

Townlands of County Antrim
Civil parish of Grange of Nilteen
Archaeological sites in County Antrim